Sleepers Awake may refer to:
"Sleepers Awake", English name for the hymn "Wachet auf, ruft uns die Stimme" (1599) by Philipp Nicolai
"Sleepers awake", English name for the chorale cantata Wachet auf, ruft uns die Stimme, BWV 140 (1731), by Johann Sebastian Bach, based on Nicolai's hymn
The Sleeper Awakes (1910), dystopian novel by H. G. Wells about a man who sleeps for two hundred and three years
 Sleepers Awake (1946), poetry collection by Kenneth Patchen
Sleepers, Wake! Technology and the Future of Work (1982), book by Barry Jones
Sleepers Awake (band), rock band from Columbus, Ohio, formed in 2005